George Walker Johnson (9 November 1811 – 22 February 1902) was a contractor, farmer and politician in colonial Victoria, a member of the Victorian Legislative Assembly.
 
Born in Coddington, Nottinghamshire, England, Walker arrived in Adelaide, South Australia in 1839, and the Port Phillip District around 1847. In November 1900, Walker was elected to the Victorian Legislative Assembly for Kyneton Boroughs, a position he held until August 1859. Johnson unsuccessfully contested the 1859 election for Kyneton Boroughs.

Johnson died at his residence, Gainsborough, in Jennings street, Kyneton, on 22 February 1902.

References

 

1811 births
1902 deaths
Members of the Victorian Legislative Assembly
English emigrants to Australia
People from Newark and Sherwood (district)
19th-century Australian politicians